The Couzinet 10 Arc-en-Ciel ('Rainbow') was built as a first example of the three-engined, aerodynamically refined, cantilever low wing monoplane designer René Couzinet thought offered the safest long range passenger transport, for example on the South Atlantic route. Only one was completed, though other, similar aircraft of different sizes and powers followed.

Design and development

The Couzinet 10 was the first of his designs to be built, though it was the result of his design study number 27. It led to the smaller Couzinet 20 and 30 series and the larger Couzinet 40 and 70.

In plan each wing was trapezoidal, though long tips produced an approximately elliptical form. Long, narrow-chord ailerons filled most of the straight part of the trailing edges. It was entirely wooden, built around two box spars and plywood covered.

The Arc-en-Ciel was powered by three  Hispano-Suiza 8Ac water-cooled upright V8 engines. One was in the nose and the other two ahead of the wing leading edge, all within cowlings that followed the V8's cylinder heads and cooled with Lamblin radiators.

Behind the central engine the fuselage had a largely circular section, built up from frames with a maximum diameter of  linked by stringers and ply-covered into a semi-monocoque structure.  The enclosed cockpit was over the wing leading edge and behind it there was a windowed cabin with access through a starboard-side door. This contained two berths forward and, towards the back, tables for radio-operator and navigator, with a toilet further aft.   The fin was integral with the body, rising slowly from it (a characteristic feature of Couzinet's designs) and carrying a pointed, curved, deep and narrow rudder. The Arc-en-Ciel's triangular plan tailplane, mounted near mid-fuselage, had a tapered elevator with a curved cut-out for rudder movement.

The Couzinet 10 had fixed, conventional landing gear, with mainwheels below the outer engines on V-struts from the wing spars and with rubber cord shock absorbers. A small tailskid was fitted on the fuselage below the tailplane's leading edge.

The Couzinet 10 was flown for the first time on 7 May 1928 by Maurice Drouhin. Further flights demonstrated well-coordinated controls and the ability to maintain altitude with the outer engine speeds reduced to 500 rpm and the central one at 1,500 rpm, compared with a maximum 1,900 rpm. The ability to fly safely on one central engine provided, Couzinet thought, safety if an outer engine failed. By July 1928 it had been converted into the Couzinet 11 with a central  Hispano 12Lb V12 engine. The Couzinet 11 is sometimes called the Couzinet 27, using the design study number as the type number, but the Couzinet 20 series were much smaller aircraft. The Type 11 crashed at Orly on 8 August 1928 following intense aileron flutter at speed, killing both Drouhin and engineer André Lanet. A second airframe, intended to have three Hispano 12Lb engines, was barely started when it was destroyed with the first Couzinet 20 in the hangar fire at the workshops of the Société d'Aviation Letord at Meudon, France, on 17 February 1930.

Variants
From Faix
Couzinet 10 Arc-en-Ciel 1, first Couzinet built.
Couzinet 11 Arc-en-Ciel 1bis, Couzinet 10 with a  Hispano 12Lb central engine.
Couzinet 12?  Arc-en-Ciel 2, three Hispano 12Lb, burned uncompleted in hangar fire.

Specifications (Couzinet 10)

References

Trimotors
1920s French civil aircraft
10